Magnitude may refer to:

Mathematics
Euclidean vector, a quantity defined by both its magnitude and its direction
Magnitude (mathematics), the relative size of an object 
Norm (mathematics), a term for the size or length of a vector
Order of magnitude, the class of scale having a fixed value ratio to the preceding class
Scalar (mathematics), a quantity defined only by its magnitude

Astronomy
Absolute magnitude, the brightness of a celestial object corrected to a standard luminosity distance
Apparent magnitude, the calibrated apparent brightness of a celestial object
Instrumental magnitude, the uncalibrated apparent magnitude of a celestial object
Magnitude (astronomy), a measure of brightness and brightness differences used in astronomy
Magnitude of eclipse or geometric magnitude, the size of the eclipsed part of the Sun during a solar eclipse or the Moon during a lunar eclipse
Photographic magnitude, the brightness of a celestial object corrected for photographic sensitivity, symbol mpg
Visual magnitude, the brightness of a celestial object in visible, symbol mv

Seismology
Seismic magnitude scales, the energy in an earthquake, measures include:
Moment magnitude scale, based on seismic moment, supersedes the Richter scale
Richter magnitude scale, the energy of an earthquake, superseded by Moment scale
Surface-wave magnitude, based on Rayleigh surface wave measurement through heat conduction
Seismic intensity scales, the local severity of a quake

Arts and media
Magnitude (Community), a recurring character from the television series Community